The end of Roman rule in Britain was the transition from Roman Britain to post-Roman Britain. Roman rule ended in different parts of Britain at different times, and under different circumstances.

In 383, the usurper Magnus Maximus withdrew troops from northern and western Britain, probably leaving local warlords in charge. Around 410, the Romano-British expelled the magistrates of the usurper Constantine III. He had previously stripped the Roman garrison from Britain and taken it to Gaul in response to the Crossing of the Rhine in late 406, leaving the island a victim to barbarian attacks. Roman Emperor Honorius replied to a request for assistance with the Rescript of Honorius, telling the Roman cities to see to their own defence, a tacit acceptance of temporary British self-government. Honorius was fighting a large-scale war in Italy against the Visigoths under their leader Alaric, with Rome itself under siege. No forces could be spared to protect distant Britain. Though it is likely that Honorius expected to regain control over the provinces soon, by the mid-6th century Procopius recognised that Roman control of Britannia was entirely lost.

Background
By the early 5th century, the Roman Empire could no longer defend itself against either internal rebellion or the external threat posed by Germanic tribes expanding in Western Europe. This situation and its consequences governed the eventual permanent detachment of Britain from the rest of the Empire. After a period of local self-rule the Anglo-Saxons came to southern England in the 440s. 

In the late 4th century, the Empire was controlled by members of a dynasty that included the Emperor Theodosius I. This family retained political power within itself and formed alliances by intermarriage with other dynasties, at the same time engaging in internecine power struggles and fighting off outside contenders (called "usurpers") attempting to replace the ruling dynasty with one of their own. These internal machinations drained the Empire of both military and civilian resources. Many thousands of soldiers were lost in battling attempted coups by figures such as Firmus, Magnus Maximus and Eugenius.

The Empire's historical relationship with Germanic tribes was sometimes hostile, at other times cooperative, but ultimately fatal, as it was unable to prevent those tribes from assuming a dominant role in the relationship. By the early 5th century, as a result of severe losses and depleted tax income, the Western Roman Empire's military forces were dominated by Germanic troops, and Romanised Germans played a significant role in the empire's internal politics. Various Germanic and other tribes beyond the frontiers were able to take advantage of the Empire's weakened state, both to expand into Roman territory and, in some cases, to move their entire populations into lands once considered exclusively Roman, culminating in various successful migrations from 406 onwards. The crossing of the Rhine caused intense fear in Britannia, prone as it was to being cut off from the Empire by raids on the primary communications route from Italy, to Trier to the Channel coast. In the event, this was much more than just another raid.

Chronology

383–388
In 383, the Roman general then assigned to Britain, Magnus Maximus, launched his successful bid for imperial power, crossing to Gaul with his troops. He killed the Western Roman Emperor Gratian and ruled Gaul and Britain as Caesar (i.e., as a "sub-emperor" under Theodosius I). 383 is the last date for any evidence of a Roman presence in the north and west of Britain, perhaps excepting troop assignments at the tower on Holyhead Mountain in Anglesey and at western coastal posts such as Lancaster. These outposts may have lasted into the 390s, but they were a very minor presence, intended primarily to stop attacks and settlement by groups of Déisi, from Ireland.

Coins dated later than 383 have been excavated along Hadrian's Wall, suggesting that troops were not stripped from it, as once thought or, if they were, they were quickly returned as soon as Maximus had won his victory in Gaul. In the De Excidio et Conquestu Britanniae, written c. 540, Gildas attributed an exodus of troops and senior administrators from Britain to Maximus, saying that he left not only with all of its troops, but also with all of its armed bands, governors, and the flower of its youth, never to return.

Raids by Saxons, Picts, and the Scoti of Ireland had been ongoing in the late 4th century, but these increased in the years after 383. There were also large-scale permanent Irish settlements made along the coasts of Wales under circumstances that remain unclear. Maximus campaigned in Britain against both the Picts and Scoti, with historians differing on whether this was in the year 382 or 384 (i.e., whether the campaign was before or after he became Caesar). Welsh legend relates that before launching his usurpation, Maximus made preparations for an altered governmental and defence framework for the beleaguered provinces. Figures such as Coel Hen were said to be placed into key positions to protect the island in Maximus's absence. As such claims were designed to buttress Welsh genealogy and land claims, they should be viewed with some scepticism.

In 388, Maximus led his army across the Alps into Italy in an attempt to claim the purple. The effort failed when he was defeated in Pannonia at the Battle of the Save (in modern Croatia) and at the Battle of Poetovio (at Ptuj in modern Slovenia). He was then executed by Theodosius.

389–406
With Maximus's death, Britain came back under the rule of Emperor Theodosius I until 392, when the usurper Eugenius made a bid for imperial power in the Western Roman Empire until 394 when he was defeated and killed by Theodosius. When Theodosius died in 395, his 10-year-old son Honorius succeeded him as Western Roman Emperor. The real power behind the throne, however, was Stilicho, the son-in-law of Theodosius' brother and the father-in-law of Honorius.

Britain was suffering raids by the Scoti, Saxons, and Picts and, sometime between 396 and 398, Stilicho allegedly ordered a campaign against the Picts, likely a naval campaign intended to end their seaborne raids on the east coast of Britain. He may also have ordered campaigns against the Scoti and Saxons at the same time, but either way this would be the last Roman campaign in Britain of which there is any record.

In 401 or 402 Stilicho faced wars with the Visigothic king Alaric and the Ostrogothic king Radagaisus. Needing military manpower, he stripped Hadrian's Wall of troops for the final time. The year 402 is the last date of any Roman coinage found in large numbers in Britain, suggesting either that Stilicho also stripped the remaining troops from Britain, or that the Empire could no longer afford to pay the troops who were still there. Meanwhile, the Picts, Saxons and Scoti continued their raids, which may have increased in scope. In 405, for example, Niall of the Nine Hostages is described as having raided along the southern coast of Britain.

407–410
On the last day of December 406 (or, perhaps, 405), the Alans, Vandals, and Suebi living east of Gaul crossed the Rhine, possibly when it was frozen over, and began widespread devastation.

As there was no effective Roman response, the remaining Roman military in Britain feared that a Germanic crossing of the Channel into Britain was next, and dispensed with imperial authority – an action perhaps made easier by the high probability that the troops had not been paid for some time. Their intent was to choose a commander who would lead them in securing their future but their first two choices, Marcus and Gratian, did not meet their expectations and were killed. Their third choice was the soldier Constantine III.

In 407, Constantine took charge of the remaining troops in Britain, led them across the Channel into Gaul, rallied support there, and attempted to set himself up as Western Roman Emperor. Honorius' loyalist forces south of the Alps were preoccupied with fending off the Visigoths and were unable to put down the rebellion swiftly, giving Constantine the opportunity to extend his new empire to include Hispania.

In 409, Constantine's control of his empire fell apart. Part of his military forces were in Hispania, making them unavailable for action in Gaul, and some of those in Gaul were swayed against him by loyalist Roman generals. The Germans living west of the Rhine River rose against him, perhaps encouraged by Roman loyalists, and those living east of the river crossed into Gaul. Britain, now without any troops for protection and having suffered particularly severe Saxon raids in 408 and 409, viewed the situation in Gaul with renewed alarm. Perhaps feeling they had no hope of relief under Constantine, both the Romano-Britons and some of the Gauls expelled Constantine's magistrates in 409 or 410. The Byzantine historian Zosimus (fl. 490s – 510s) directly blamed Constantine for the expulsion, saying that he had allowed the Saxons to raid, and that the Britons and Gauls were reduced to such straits that they revolted from the Roman Empire, 'rejected Roman law, reverted to their native customs, and armed themselves to ensure their own safety'.

An appeal for help by the British communities was, according to Zosimus, rejected by the Emperor Honorius in 410 AD. In the text called the Rescript of Honorius of 411, the Western Emperor Honorius tells the British civitates to look to their own defence as his regime was still fighting usurpers in the south of Gaul and trying to deal with the Visigoths who were in the very south of Italy. The first reference to this rescript is written by the sixth-century Byzantine scholar Zosimus and is located randomly in the middle of a discussion of southern Italy; no further mention of Britain is made, which has led some, though not all, modern academics to suggest that the rescript does not apply to Britain, but to Bruttium in Italy.

Historian Christopher Snyder wrote that protocol dictated that Honorius address his correspondence to imperial officials, and the fact that he did not implies that the cities of Britain were now the highest Roman authority remaining on the island. The idea that there may have been larger-scale political formations still intact on the island has not been completely discredited however.

At the time that the Rescript was sent, Honorius was holed up in Ravenna by the Visigoths and was unable to prevent their Sack of Rome (410). He was certainly in no position to offer any relief to anyone. As for Constantine III, he was not equal to the intrigues of imperial Rome and by 411 his cause was spent. His son was killed along with those major supporters who had not turned against him, and he himself was assassinated.

Interpretative variations
There are various interpretations that characterise the events in a way that supports a particular thesis without taking issue with the basic chronology.

The historian Theodor Mommsen (Britain, 1885) said that "It was not Britain that gave up Rome, but Rome that gave up Britain ...", arguing that Roman needs and priorities lay elsewhere. His position has retained scholarly support over the passage of time.

Michael Jones (The End of Roman Britain, 1998) took the opposite view, saying that it was Britain that left Rome, arguing that numerous usurpers based in Britain combined with poor administration caused the Romano-Britons to revolt. Certain scholars such as J. B. Bury ("The Notitia Dignitatum" 1920) and German historian Ralf Scharf, disagreed entirely with the standard chronology.  They argued that the evidence in fact supports later Roman involvement in Britain, post 410.

Factual disputes

Regarding the events of 409 and 410 when the Romano-Britons expelled Roman officials and sent a request for aid to Honorius, Michael Jones (The End of Roman Britain, 1998) offered a different chronology to the same end result: he suggested that the Britons first appealed to Rome and when no help was forthcoming, they expelled the Roman officials and took charge of their own affairs.

One theory that occurs in some modern histories concerns the Rescript of Honorius, holding that it refers to the cities of the Bruttii (who lived at the "toe" of Italy in modern Calabria), rather than to the cities of the Britons. The suggestion is based on the assumption that the source (Zosimus) or a copyist made an error and actually meant Brettia when Brettania was written, and noting that the passage that contains the Rescript is otherwise concerned with events in northern Italy.

Criticisms of the suggestion range from treating the passage in the way it was written by Zosimus and ignoring the suggestion, to simply noting its speculative nature, to a discussion of problems with the suggestion (e.g., 'why would Honorius write to the cities of the Bruttii rather than to his own provincial governor for that region?', and 'why does far-off southern Italy belong in a passage about northern Italy any more than far-off Britain?'). The theory also contradicts the account of Gildas, who provides independent support that the reference is to Britain by repeating the essence of Zosimus's account and clearly applying it to Britain.

E. A. Thompson ("Britain, A.D. 406–410", in Britannia, 8 (1977), pp. 303–318) offered a more provocative theory to explain the expulsion of officials and appeal for Roman aid. He suggested that a revolt consisting of dissident peasants, not unlike the Bagaudae of Gaul, also existing in Britain, and when they revolted and expelled the Roman officials, the landowning class then made an appeal for Roman aid. There is no direct textual statement of this, though it might be plausible if the definition of 'bagaudae' is changed to fit the circumstances. There is no need to do so, as any number of rational scenarios already fit the circumstances. There is the possibility that some form of bagaudae existed in Britain, but were not necessarily relevant to the events of 409 and 410. The alleged ubiquity of Pelagianism amongst the British population may have contributed to such a movement if it had existed, not to mention large-scale purges amongst the British elite over previous decades. Among the works that mention but skirt the issue is Koch's Celtic Culture (2005), which cites Thompson's translation of Zosimus and goes on to say "The revolt in Britain may have involved bacaudae or peasant rebels as was the case in Armorica, but this is not certain."

Notes

References

Further reading

Roman Britain
Migration Period
Sub-Roman Britain
4th century in England
5th century in England
4th century in Wales
5th century in Wales
380s in the Roman Empire
390s in the Roman Empire
400s in the Roman Empire
410s in the Roman Empire
Endings

it:Britannia (provincia romana)#IV e V secolo: declino e fine del dominio romano